Sajjad Sherally Fazel (born May 14, 1991) is a Canadian clinical pharmacist, public health researcher, and the founder of Afya Yako, Tanzania's first online health promotion initiative. Afya Yako impacted thousands of Tanzanians and inspired an online health movement in Tanzania.

Early life and education
Sajjad was born and raised in Dar es Salaam, Tanzania. He graduated from Haven of Peace Academy in 2009. He received a Doctor of Pharmacy from Manipal Academy of Higher Education in early 2015. During his time at Manipal, he was the lead for VSO - Manipal, a university voluntary organization.  In 2018, he received a Master of Public Health from the University of Western Ontario. Sajjad received an Institute Community Support Travel Award from the Canadian Institutes of Health Research for presenting a poster on Afya Yako at the Canadian Public Health Association Conference in 2018. He is also a member of the World Economic Forum's Global Shapers community. He currently resides in Calgary.

Career

Research
In May 2018, Sajjad joined the Canadian Cancer Society as a policy researcher working on the smoke-free campuses initiative. This initiative advocated for post-secondary institutions to adopt a 100% smoke-free campus and produced a report of smoke-free campuses in Canada, as a result, several university and colleges adopted the policy and the initiative received wide media attention.

In January 2019, Sajjad joined Alberta Health Services and the University of Calgary as a public health researcher studying the safe handling of antineoplastic drugs. He is currently researching and addressing the spread of COVID-19 misinformation for which he has appeared on several news outlets. Sajjad has published numerous articles in academic journals and popular media on topics related to cancer prevention, tobacco control, and COVID-19 misinformation.

Columnist
Sajjad began his career in journalism in early 2014, by writing for a local magazine called, What's happening in Dar. In early 2015, he caught the eye of Nipashe editor, who hired Sajjad as a health columnist for the Swahili language Tanzanian newspaper. Sajjad remained with Nipashe for 6 months, covering local health issues.

In July 2015, Sajjad left Nipashe and was immediately recruited by The Citizen editor as a health columnist for a new health page published every Monday. At The Citizen, Sajjad discussed about various health topics and advocated for change in the health sector by raising various concerns that provoked thought and action.

In July 2016, Sajjad advocated against the widespread use of Hookah in Tanzania through various articles and radio talks that led the President of Tanzania, John Magufuli to ban the use of Hookah nationwide.

Sajjad continued his advocacy by bringing to light the Aflatoxin epidemic in Tanzania and proposing a solution for it. Questions were raised towards the Ministry of Health and Social Welfare by the public and funding for the proposed solution began which completed on December 19, 2017.

Throughout 2016, Sajjad continued to advocate about the rise of Non-communicable diseases in Tanzania, discussing various topics including healthy eating and the importance of exercise. This caused the Ministry of Health and Social Welfare to institute a national day of exercise in December 2016.

Social media
In June 2016, Sajjad founded Afya Yako Online, a Swahili-based health education and awareness health initiative that educated and empowered thousands of Tanzanians on Twitter, Facebook and Instagram. This initiative was sponsored by Kwanza TV. In 2017, the Afya Yako Online initiative had received great acclaim from notable persons, politicians and media alike.

Other media appearances
Sajjad has appeared in numerous Television and Radio shows as himself advocating for healthy policies and educating the public. He also appeared on BBC Swahili Radio in October 2016. Sajjad continues to provide commentary on various health issues for Tanzanian Newspapers. He has also appeared several times as a guest speaker on Canadian television and radio shows.

Selected works and publications

Selected articles

Selected journals

References

External links
LinkedIn Profile
University of Calgary Profile

Living people
1991 births
People from Dar es Salaam
Tanzanian people of Indian descent
Tanzanian journalists
Tanzanian health activists
University of Western Ontario alumni
Manipal Academy of Higher Education alumni
Canadian pharmacists
Canadian medical researchers